Sir Egbert Laurie Lucas Hammond, KCSI, CBE (12 January 1873 – 28 January 1939) was a British colonial administrator in India. He was Governor of Assam from 1927 to 1932.

References 

1873 births
1939 deaths
Governors of Assam
Indian Civil Service (British India) officers
Knights Commander of the Order of the Star of India
Commanders of the Order of the British Empire
Alumni of Keble College, Oxford
British people in colonial India